Bango (Mobango, Babango), is a Bantu language spoken in the Democratic Republic of Congo. Ethnologue suggests it may be a dialect of Budza, but Nurse & Philippson (2003) list it as one of the Bwa languages.

References

Bwa languages
Languages of the Democratic Republic of the Congo